Okay is a term of approval, assent, or acknowledgment.

Okay may also refer to:

Music

Albums and songs
 Okay (album), by As It Is, or the title song, 2017
 Okay, an album by Dowsing, 2016
 "Okay" (LANY and Julia Michaels song), 2019
"Okay!" (Dave Dee, Dozy, Beaky, Mick & Tich song), 1967
 "Okay", a song by Lil Baby and Lil Durk from The Voice of the Heroes, 2021
 "Okay", a song by Nivea from Complicated, 2005

Other uses in music
 Okay (band), a German pop group  with a 1987 hit song of the same name
 Okeh Records, an American record label

Places
 Okay, Arkansas
 Okay, Oklahoma
 Okay High School, in Okay, Oklahoma

Other
 Okay (film), a 2002 Danish film starring Paprika Steen
 Okay (name), Turkish masculine given name and surname
 Okay Airways, a Chinese airline
 Okey, a Turkish tile game similar to Rummikub
 Onnu Kure Áyiram Yogam, a people's association in Kodungallur, Kerala, India

See also
 OK (disambiguation)
 Okaya (disambiguation)